The 2012–13 Albany Great Danes men's basketball team represented the University at Albany, SUNY during the 2012–13 NCAA Division I men's basketball season. The Great Danes, led by 12th year head coach Will Brown, played their home games at SEFCU Arena and were members of the America East Conference. They finished the season 24–11, 9–7 in America East play to finish in fifth place. They were champions of the America East tournament, winning the championship over Vermont, to earn an automatic bid to the 2013 NCAA tournament where they lost in the second round to Duke.

Roster

Schedule

|-
!colspan=12 style=|Regular Season

|-
!colspan=12 style=| America East tournament 

|-
!colspan=12 style=| NCAA Tournament 

Albany Great Danes men's basketball seasons
Albany
Albany
Albany Great Danes
Albany Great Danes